The 2015–16 East of Scotland Football League (known for sponsorship reasons as the Central Taxis East of Scotland League) was the 87th season of the East of Scotland Football League, and the 2nd season as the sixth tier of the Scottish football pyramid system. The season began on 22 August 2015 and finished on 28 May 2016. Lothian Thistle Hutchison Vale were the defending champions.

The league was merged into a single division of 16 teams, for the first time since 1986–87.  Following the resignation of Easthouses Lily the membership had tied 8/8 on a vote between two divisions of eight or a single division of 16, and the League Board selected the latter. As a result, Coldstream and Craigroyston effectively avoided relegation despite finishing in the bottom two places of the previous season's Premier Division.

This season saw the departure of Easthouses Lily who left to join the Scottish Junior Football Association.

Kelso United resigned at the start of September after fulfilling their opening East of Scotland Qualifying League and Qualifying Cup matches and three league games. This reduced the number of clubs to 15. Their league defeats to Coldstream (0–7), Leith Athletic (5–0) and Burntisland Shipyard (5–0) were expunged.

Teams

The following teams have changed division since the 2014–15 season.

From East of Scotland Football League
Transferred to East South Division
 Easthouses Lily

League table

References

5